Robert Cottingham (born 1935 in Brooklyn, New York) is an American artist known for his paintings and prints of urban American landscapes showing building facades, neon signs, movie marquees, railroad heralds and shop fronts.

Although often considered one of the most important photorealist painters, Cottingham rejects the label of being a photorealist. He rather sees himself as a realist painter working in a long tradition of American vernacular scenes in the line of the likes of Stuart Davis, Charles Demuth, Edward Hopper and Charles Sheeler.  Cottingham regards his works as no mere painterly translations of photographs or reproductions of reality since he often changes the words in his facades to alter the meaning of the subject. His primary interest lies in the subject matter — the so-called Americana.

Cottingham studied art at Brooklyn's Pratt Institute and started his career in advertising.  After relocating to Los Angeles for work, he began to commit seriously to painting. In 1968, he ended his advertising career and devoted himself full-time to painting.  In the late 1960s, he started using photography in his painting practice.

His first solo show was in 1971 at the OK Harris Gallery in New York.  In 1990, he was elected into the National Academy of Design as an Associate Academician, and became a full Academician in 1994. A retrospective of Cottingham's work took place at the Smithsonian American Art Museum in 1998.

Notes

1935 births
Living people
20th-century American painters
American male painters
Artists from Brooklyn
Painters from New York City
20th-century American male artists
National Academy of Design members